Superman: Unbound is a 2013 animated direct-to-video superhero film based on the 2008 comic book story arc "Superman: Brainiac" by Geoff Johns. It was directed by James Tucker and scripted by Bob Goodman. It is the 16th film of the DC Universe Animated Original Movies. The film's sneak preview was included with Batman: The Dark Knight Returns, Part 2 and Injustice: Gods Among Us.

Plot
Offering herself as a hostage, Lois Lane is caught in an aerial confrontation between her terrorist captors and the unpredictable Supergirl before Superman arrives to save the day. Soon after, knowing Superman's civilian identity, Lois attempts to get Clark Kent to make their relationship public despite his fear of the consequences, but their argument is halted by a Daily Planet staff meeting before Kent leaves after being alerted to an approaching meteor. Intercepting it, Superman learns the meteor is actually a robot that he promptly defeats before activating its beacon and taking it to the Fortress of Solitude. With help from a fearful Supergirl, Superman learns the robot is actually a drone controlled by a being named Brainiac, a Coluan scientist who subjected himself to extensive motor, skeletal, and cybernetic enhancements, turning him from a human-like, thin, and hairless being to a muscular, red-eyed giant with computer-like components and enhanced physical abilities comparable to Superman's. Supergirl, horrified at seeing Brainiac, reveals her experience with the monster. Brainiac had seized and miniaturized Krypton's capital city of Kandor prior to the planet's destruction with her father and mother attempting to track him down before they mysteriously lost contact with Krypton. She is now worried that Brainiac will do to the world what he did to Kandor.

Fearing more drones will come, Superman flies through the galaxy with a Kryptonian spacecraft in an attempt to track down Brainiac before finding his drones attacking a planet. Though he attempts to stop them, Superman witnesses Brainiac capture the planet's capital like he did with Kandor before firing a Solar Aggressor missile to consume the planet in its exploding sun. The explosion knocks Superman unconscious, and he is brought on board Brainiac’s skull-shaped, tentacled ship. Coming to in the examination room, he fights his way through the vessel before he discovers a room full of bottled cities prior to being attacked by Brainiac. At this point, confirming that he spared Krypton because of its eventual destruction, it is shown that Brainiac has been collecting information on all the planets he visited and uploaded it into his neural core before destroying them. Using Superman's spacecraft and his telepathic abilities, Brainiac discovers that he has been living on Earth. Brainiac decides to chart a course to Earth while sending Superman into Kandor. Inside Kandor, his strength waning due to the artificial red sun, Superman meets his uncle Zor-El and aunt Alura. They explain that Brainiac was instructed to learn all that is knowable about the galaxy. Being a cyborg, Brainiac interpreted his directive literally and realized that he could not achieve this goal because life keeps changing. His knowledge of one world would become out-of-date as soon as he moved on to the next world. Brainiac therefore destroys civilizations after studying them so that they cannot change further, thus leaving him with literally complete and up-to-date knowledge of them.

Superman formulates a plan and escapes Kandor using the subjugator robots. From there, Superman disables Brainiac's ship and takes Kandor with him back to Earth. At that time, Lois learns from Supergirl why Superman left and alerts the Pentagon of a possible invasion by Brainiac, who eventually repairs his ship and arrives in Metropolis.

Despite everyone, including Supergirl, doing their best to fend his drones off, Metropolis is encased in a bottle and both Superman and Supergirl are captured. Having hooked Superman up to his ship, Brainiac reveals that Earth offers nothing to him, tortures Superman by overloading his mind with data to obtain Kandor, and attempts to destroy the planet. However, telling his captor what Earth means to him, Superman breaks free and then frees Supergirl and convinces her to stop the Solar-Aggressor from hitting the sun. Remembering Zor-El's words about Brainiac's ideals, Superman knocks him out of the ship and they crash into a swamp. As he fights Brainiac, Superman forces the cyborg to experience the chaos of life itself outside of the safe, artificial environments he has created. Eventually, the combined mental and physical strain takes its toll on Brainiac, and he combusts and is reduced to ash and molten machinery. After restoring Metropolis, taking Kandor to another planet similar to Krypton to restore its normal size, and establishing a Kryptonian colony where they can rebuild, Superman makes his love life with Lois as Kent public with a marriage proposal.

In the post-credits scene, Brainiac's remains that are placed in the Fortress of Solitude glow, indicating that Brainiac still has some degree of his power.

Cast

 Matt Bomer as Kal-El / Clark Kent / Superman 
 Stana Katic as Lois Lane
 John Noble as Brainiac
 Molly Quinn as Kara Zor-El / Supergirl
 Diedrich Bader as Steve Lombard
 Alexander Gould as Jimmy Olsen
 Frances Conroy as Martha Kent
 Stephen Root as Zor-El
 Jason Beghe as Terrorist Leader
 Sirena Irwin as Alura
 Wade Williams as Perry White
 Melissa Disney as Thara Ak-Var
 Michael-Leon Wooley as Ron Troupe
 Will Yun Lee as Parasoldier Leader
 Ian James Corlett as Kryptonian #1
 Andrea Romano as News Anchor #2, Superman's Ship

Reception
Superman: Unbound received positive reviews. IGN gave the film a 6.5 out of 10. Brian Lowry of Variety stated "the 75-minute film boasts some impressive animation and action sequences – essentially getting the job done, without by any means approaching the operatic majesty of the studio's recent two-part epic The Dark Knight Returns". Common Sense Media gave the film a 4 star rating out of 5, commenting "Superman fights, learns life lessons in animated thriller".

The film earned $1,686,042 from domestic DVD sales and $1,804,778 from domestic Blu-ray sales, bringing its total domestic home video earnings to $3,490,820.

References

External links

 Official Warner Bros. Site
 Official DC Comics Site
 
 

2013 direct-to-video films
2010s English-language films
2010s direct-to-video animated superhero films
2010s animated superhero films
DC Universe Animated Original Movies
Animated Superman films
Films based on works by Geoff Johns
Alien invasions in films
Drone films
2013 animated films
2013 films
2010s American animated films
Animated superhero films
Animated science fiction films
2010s science fiction films
Colonialism in popular culture